In geometry, the truncated order-4 heptagonal tiling is a uniform tiling of the hyperbolic plane. It has Schläfli symbol of t{7,4}.

Constructions 
There are two uniform constructions of this tiling, first by the [7,4] kaleidoscope, and second by removing the last mirror, [7,4,1+], gives [7,7], (*772).

Symmetry 
There is only one simple subgroup [7,7]+, index 2, removing all the mirrors. This symmetry can be doubled to 742 symmetry by adding a bisecting mirror.

Related polyhedra and tiling

References
 John H. Conway, Heidi Burgiel, Chaim Goodman-Strass, The Symmetries of Things 2008,  (Chapter 19, The Hyperbolic Archimedean Tessellations)

See also

Uniform tilings in hyperbolic plane
List of regular polytopes

External links 

 Hyperbolic and Spherical Tiling Gallery
 KaleidoTile 3: Educational software to create spherical, planar and hyperbolic tilings
 Hyperbolic Planar Tessellations, Don Hatch

Heptagonal tilings
Hyperbolic tilings
Isogonal tilings
Order-4 tilings
Truncated tilings
Uniform tilings